Alwa was a Swedish folk music group which released an album in 2002 but dissolved after a brief career.

Band Members 
 Anna Elwing —- violin, vocal
 Karin Ohlsson —- violin
 Torbjörn Righard —- flute, saxophone
 Jonas Göransson —- guitar
 Tina Quartey —- percussion

Discography

Albums 

 2002 — Alwa, Amigo, AMCD 747

References 

Swedish folk music groups